Malamatidia is a genus of Southeast Asian sac spiders first described by Christa L. Deeleman-Reinhold in 2001.

Species
 it contains five species:
Malamatidia bohorokensis Deeleman-Reinhold, 2001 (type) – Indonesia (Sumatra, Borneo)
Malamatidia christae Jäger & Dankittipakul, 2010 – Laos
Malamatidia thorelli Deeleman-Reinhold, 2001 – Indonesia (Sulawesi)
Malamatidia vethi Deeleman-Reinhold, 2001 – Malaysia, Indonesia (Borneo)
Malamatidia zu Jäger & Dankittipakul, 2010 – Laos

References

Araneomorphae genera
Clubionidae
Spiders of Asia